Reedy Creek may refer to several places:

Places

Australia 
 Reedy Creek, Queensland, a suburb of the Gold Coast
 Reedy Creek Observatory, an observatory located in the above community
 Reedy Creek Reserve, a nature reserve in Queensland
Reedy Creek, South Australia, a locality
Reedy Creek Conservation Park, a protected area
Reedy Creek, Victoria, a locality
Batlow, New South Wales, a town formerly named Reedy Creek

United States 
 Lake Buena Vista, Florida, formerly called the City of Reedy Creek
 Reedy Creek Improvement District, Florida

Watercourses

 Reedy Creek (Blacktown, Sydney), a tributary of the Eastern Creek in the Blacktown local government area of New South Wales, Australia
 Reedy Creek (Crabtree Creek tributary), a stream in North Carolina
 Reedy Creek (West Virginia), a stream
 Reedy Creek (Dan River tributary), a stream in Halifax County, Virginia

See also
 Reedy (disambiguation)